Nelson Jesus Perez (born June 16, 1961) is an American prelate of the Roman Catholic Church who serves as the 10th archbishop of the Archdiocese of Philadelphia in Pennsylvania, having been appointed by Pope Francis in January 2020. He previously served as bishop of the Diocese of Cleveland in Ohio from 2017 to 2020 and as an auxiliary bishop of the Diocese of Rockville Centre in New York from 2012 to 2017.

Biography

Early life and education
Nelson Perez was born in Miami, Florida, on June 16, 1961, to David and Emma Perez. His parents were exiles from Cuba. When Nelson Perez was a child, the family moved to West New York, New Jersey. He attended P.S. Number 4 and Memorial High School in West New York. Perez earned a Bachelor of Arts degree from Montclair State University in Montclair, New Jersey, in 1983, then went to Puerto Rico to teach at Colegio La Piedad, a Catholic elementary school in Carolina. He then entered Philadelphia's St. Charles Borromeo Seminary where he earned a Master of Arts and a Master of Divinity degree in 1988 and 1989 respectively.

Ordination and priesthood
Perez was ordained to the priesthood by Cardinal Anthony Bevilacqua for the Archdiocese of Philadelphia on May 20, 1989. After his ordination, Perez was appointed  curate at Saint Ambrose Parish in Philadelphia.  In 1993, he left this position to become the founding director of the Catholic Institute for Evangelization in Philadelphia.

In 1994, Perez assumed the additional job of teaching psychology and religious studies at LaSalle University in Philadelphia, working there until 2008.  In 1998, Perez was named chaplain to his holiness by Pope John Paul II with the title of monsignor.

In 2002, Perez left his position at the Catholic Institute to become pastor of Saint William Parish in Philadelphia.  The archdiocese moved him in 2009 to serve as pastor of Saint Agnes Parish in West Chester, Pennsylvania.  That same year, Perez was named a prelate of honor by Pope Benedict XVI.

Auxiliary Bishop of Rockville Centre 

On June 8, 2012, Perez was appointed titular bishop of Catrum and auxiliary bishop of the Diocese of Rockville Center by Pope Benedict XVI. He received his episcopal consecration by Bishop William Murphy on July 25, 2012.  Perez was appointed episcopal vicar for the Hispanic Ministry, overseeing fifty-four parishes.

Bishop of Cleveland

On July 11, 2017, Pope Francis appointed Perez as the 11th bishop of the Diocese of Cleveland. He was installed on September 5, 2017.

In 2018, Perez protested the Trump administration policy of separating the children of undocumented immigrant families from their parents, saying that we had lost our moral compass.

Archbishop of Philadelphia
Perez was named archbishop of the Archdiocese of Philadelphia on January 23, 2020, by Pope Francis, succeeding Archbishop Charles J. Chaput. His installation Mass was celebrated on February 18, 2020. He is the first Hispanic American bishop of Philadelphia.

See also

 Catholic Church hierarchy
 Catholic Church in the United States
 Historical list of the Catholic bishops of the United States
 List of Catholic bishops of the United States
 Lists of patriarchs, archbishops, and bishops

References

External links
Roman Catholic Diocese of Cleveland
Roman Catholic Diocese of Rockville Centre
Roman Catholic Archdiocese of Philadelphia 

 

Living people
1961 births
Christian clergy from New Jersey
St. Charles Borromeo Seminary alumni
Memorial High School (West New York, New Jersey) alumni
Montclair State University alumni
People from West New York, New Jersey
21st-century Roman Catholic archbishops in the United States
American people of Cuban descent